Matthew Harvey Clark (July 15, 1937 – January 22, 2023) was an American prelate of the Roman Catholic Church. He served as bishop of the Diocese of Rochester in Upstate New York from 1979 until 2012.

Clark's 33-year tenure as bishop was the second-longest in the Diocese of Rochester's history, after the 40-year tenure of Bishop Bernard McQuaid.

Early life and education
Matthew Clark was born in Waterford, New York, to Matthew and Grace (née Bills) Clark. He attended Catholic Central High School in Troy, New York, and Holy Cross College in Worcester, Massachusetts, before entering Mater Christi Seminary in Albany, New York.

Clark also attended St. Bernard's Seminary in Rochester, New York. He then studied in Rome at the Pontifical North American College and the Pontifical Gregorian University.

Priesthood
On December 19, 1962, Clark was ordained to the priesthood in Rome by Bishop Martin O'Connor in the Sacro Cuore di Cristo Reon Basilica for the Diocese of Albany in New York. He obtained a Licentiate of Sacred Theology from the Gregorian University in 1963. On his return to New York, Clark taught at the Vincentian Institute while serving at Our Lady of Mercy Parish, both in Albany.

Clark returned to the Gregorian University in 1964, earning a Licentiate of Canon Law in 1966. In 1966, Clark was appointed vice-chancellor for the Diocese of Albany. In 1967, he became assistant pastor at St. Ambrose Parish in Latham, New York. Clark was also named chair of the Diocesan Priests' Personnel Board in 1969. 

In 1972, Clark went to Rome to serve as assistant spiritual director of the Pontifical North American College. He became its full spiritual director in 1974.

Bishop of Rochester
On April 23, 1979, Pope John Paul II appointed Clark as the eighth bishop of the Diocese of Rochester. He was consecrated in Rome on May 27, 1979, by John Paul II himself, with Archbishop Duraisamy Lourdusamy and Cardinal Eduardo Somalo serving as co-consecrators, at St. Peter's Basilica. Clark selected as his episcopal motto: "God's Love Endures Forever". Clark was installed as bishop at the Rochester War Memorial in Rochester, New York, on June 26, 1979.

In 1986, Cardinal Josef Ratzinger ordered Clark to withdraw his imprimatur, or church approval, from a sex education manual written by a priest in his parish. Ratzinger said the manual was "defective" on church teachings. On March 12, 1986, Clark defended one of his priests, the theologian Father Charles Curran, from criticism by Vatican officials for his stands on birth control, abortion rights for women, homosexuality, and divorce.

In 2003, Clark was criticized over his $11 million renovation and liturgical re-alignment of Sacred Heart Cathedral in Rochester. Clark received some credit for clamping down on abusive priests. In 2004, the diocese was deemed to be in "full compliance" with the US Conference of Catholic Bishops (USCCB) charter for the protection of children and young people. Clark presided over the unpopular closing of many of Rochester's parochial schools and parishes, pledging to complete the "re-sizing" of the diocese prior to his retirement in 2012.

Retirement 
On September 21, 2012, Pope Benedict XVI accepted Clark's letter of resignation as Bishop of Rochester. The Pope named Bishop Robert Cunningham as apostolic administrator until the installation of the new bishop, Salvatore Matano. In September 2019, Clark revealed that he had been diagnosed with early onset Alzheimer's disease.

In February 2020, U.S. Bankruptcy Judge Paul R. Warren ruled that Clark must testify as part of bankruptcy proceedings for the Diocese of Rochester. Clark's lawyer had argued that his client was incapable of doing it due to his Alzheimer's condition.  On July 6 2020, Clark was questioned for three hours in a deposition hearing. He admitted sending Eugene Emo, a priest later convicted of sexual abuse of a minor, to a treatment facility, then later reassigning him to another parish.

Clark died on January 22, 2023, at the age of 85.

See also
 

 Catholic Church hierarchy
 Catholic Church in the United States
 Historical list of the Catholic bishops of the United States
 List of Catholic bishops of the United States
 Lists of patriarchs, archbishops, and bishops

References

External links
Roman Catholic Diocese of Rochester Official Site
Matthew Harvey Clark at Catholic Hierarchy

Episcopal succession

1937 births
2023 deaths
People from Waterford, New York
20th-century Roman Catholic bishops in the United States
21st-century Roman Catholic bishops in the United States
Bishops appointed by Pope John Paul II
Roman Catholic Diocese of Albany
College of the Holy Cross alumni
Roman Catholic Diocese of Rochester
Pontifical North American College alumni
Pontifical Gregorian University alumni
Religious leaders from New York (state)
Catholics from New York (state)